Kumba is a steel roller coaster located at Busch Gardens Tampa Bay in Tampa, Florida. Manufactured by Bolliger & Mabillard, the ride opened in 1993. Kumba features a total of seven inversions across the 3-minute ride.

History
Kumba was officially announced in November 1992 as a record-breaking Bolliger & Mabillard roller coaster set to become the park's signature attraction. The ride officially opened to the public on April 21, 1993. When Kumba opened, it featured the world's tallest vertical loop, and was also the tallest, fastest and longest roller coaster in Florida. In 1995, Kumba conceded the title of ride with the world's tallest vertical loop to Dragon Khan at PortAventura Park which features a  vertical loop. In 1996, it conceded Florida's titles of tallest and longest roller coaster to Montu, a B&M inverted coaster in the Egypt section of the park. In 1999, it conceded the fastest title to Islands of Adventure's The Incredible Hulk Coaster, yet another B&M sitdown coaster.

Characteristics

The ride features seven inversions including a  vertical loop, a dive loop, a zero-g roll, a cobra roll and two interlocking corkscrews. The vertical loop featured on Kumba wraps around the lift hill. This element was later seen on The Riddler's Revenge at Six Flags Magic Mountain and Banshee at Kings Island. Kumba was the first ride in the world to feature a number of now-common roller coaster elements, including interlocking corkscrews and a dive loop. Riders of Kumba experience up to 3.8 times the force of gravity on the 3 minute ride.

Kumba features four steel and fiberglass trains, each containing eight cars. Each car seats four riders in a single row for a total of 32 riders per train. The block sections only allow for three trains to be on the track at any one time, meaning the ride can still operate at full capacity when one train is undergoing maintenance. With all three trains operating, the ride can achieve a capacity of 1,700 riders per hour.

The name Kumba was derived from the translation of the word "roar" in the African Kongo language.

Ride experience

The ride begins with a right-hand, 90-degree turn out of the station which then begins to climb the  chain lift hill. After reaching the peak, trains go through a small pre-drop. The ride then goes down a  drop to the left into a  vertical loop that wraps around the lift hill. After leaving the vertical loop, the ride rises up into a diving loop, followed by a zero-g roll, where riders experience a feeling of weightlessness. A straight section of track and a small hill leads to a Cobra roll. After exiting the cobra roll, the trains rise up into the mid-course brake run. The exit from the brake run leads into a pair of interlocking corkscrews. The train then dives into a tunnel and exits into an upward clockwise helix. The train then hits the final brake run, before making a right hand turn and returning to the station.

Reception
Kumba has generally been well received. Robb Alvey of Theme Park Review stated Kumba was his favorite ride in the Florida area, describing it as "an old-school, intense ride" that he has been on hundreds of times. Dewayne Bevil of the Orlando Sentinel gives Kumba ratings of 4 out of 5 for both thrill and theming. Keith Kohn, also of the Sentinel, described the ride as "an amazing experience".

The opening of Kumba had a significant impact on park attendance figures. In its debut year, park attendance increased approximately 15% to an estimated 3.8 million visitors. The park expected that trend to continue into 1994. In 1995, Joe Fincher, Busch Gardens Tampa Bay's general manager, described Kumba as a "superstar roller coaster" that "has been terrific for us".

In Amusement Today annual Golden Ticket Awards, Kumba has consistently ranked highly. It is also one of only seven roller coasters to appear in the top 50 every year since the award's inception in 1998. It debuted at position 4 in 1998, before dropping to a low of 31 in 2011 and rising to 23 the following year.

References

External links
 
 
 

Roller coasters in Tampa, Florida
Roller coasters introduced in 1993
Roller coasters in Florida
Busch Gardens Tampa Bay
1993 establishments in Florida